For the 1978 Vuelta a España, the field consisted of 99 riders; 64 finished the race.

By rider

By nationality

References

1978 Vuelta a España
1978